Roman Haša (born 15 February 1993) is a professional Czech footballer who currently plays for MFK Skalica.

References

External links
 
 

1993 births
Living people
Czech footballers
Czech Republic youth international footballers
Czech Republic under-21 international footballers
Czech expatriate footballers
Association football forwards
1. FC Slovácko players
FK Fotbal Třinec players
KFC Komárno players
MFK Skalica players
MFK Karviná players
ŠKF Sereď players
Czech First League players
2. Liga (Slovakia) players
3. Liga (Slovakia) players
Slovak Super Liga players
Expatriate footballers in Slovakia
Czech expatriate sportspeople in Slovakia